The Protestant Church of Dearsum or Saint Nicholas church is a religious building in Dearsum, Netherlands,  one of  medieval churches in Friesland. 

It is a Romanesque church  from c. 1200 with a 13th-century tower build out of red brick. In the 16th century four large windows where added to the south side. The Pipe organ was built in 1895 by the Gebroeders Ademaand was restored in 1916 and 1983 by Bakker & Timmenga. 

The church is located on the Dearsum 34 and was once a Roman Catholic church dedicated to Saint Nicholas but became a Protestant church after the protestant reformation. It is listed as a Rijksmonument, number 32301.

References

Dearsum
Rijksmonuments in Friesland
Romanesque architecture in the Netherlands
Protestant churches in the Netherlands